Reverdy is a surname. Notable people with the surname include: 

Michèle Reverdy (born 1943), French composer
Pierre Reverdy (1889–1960), French poet
Richard Reverdy (1851–1915), German civil engineer
Thomas B. Reverdy (born 1974), French novelist